Lunjevača is a mountain in the municipality of Drvar, Bosnia and Herzegovina.

See also
List of mountains in Bosnia and Herzegovina

References

Mountains of the Federation of Bosnia and Herzegovina